Hsu Wei-ning (born 7 August 1984), also known as Tiffany Ann Hsu, is a Taiwanese actress. Hsu began her career as a model, and first came to attention for her supporting roles in the Taiwanese drama series It Started with a Kiss and its sequel They Kiss Again. She also worked as a VJ for MTV Taiwan.

Her performance as Doris in the Taiwanese film Design 7 Love earned her a Golden Horse Award nomination for Best New Performer. She appeared in the drama series The Way We Were, for which she won a Golden Bell Award for Best Supporting Actress. She is also known for starring in the supernatural horror film The Tag-Along (2015) and  its sequel The Tag-Along 2 (2017).

Early life
Hsu's father is Italian-American and her mother is Taiwanese. Her father abandoned the family before she was born, leaving her mother to raise Hsu with the assistance of her maternal grandparents and her other family members. Hsu attended the Hwa Kang Arts School in Taipei where she was classmates with Rainie Yang and Alien Huang. She graduated from the Chinese Cultural University with a major in Drama Acting in 2007. Friends call her by her middle name, Ann, which is also the English name listed on her agency's profile webpage.

Career
Hsu was first noticed by Catwalk Model Agency when she participated in a talent casting for MTV Taiwan and was then signed up to be a fashion model in 2003.

In 2004, Hsu appeared in her first TV series Jia You Fei Fei (家有菲菲) and sang the theme song "甜姐辣妹". In 2005, she starred in the series It Started with a Kiss as second female lead. In 2007, Hsu appeared in her first film Amour-Legende (松鼠自殺事件). In 2009, Hsu starred in the idol drama ToGetHer and Autumn's Concerto. In 2011, Hsu starred as the second female lead of the TV drama Love You. In 2012, Hsu appeared in the micro-film Wishing for Happiness. She also starred as the female lead for the first time in the romance-drama series, Love Me or Leave Me (TV series), as a woman who was afraid of getting married but then regretted her decision when another woman tried to steal her boyfriend. In 2014, she starred in her first film as female lead in Design 7 Love (相愛的七種設計). Hsu also starred in a Resorts World Sentosa promotional four-part micro-film series titled Cupid's World of Happiness (丘比特的幸福世界) alongside Leon Jay Williams and Xiao Xiao Bin. The 40-minute-long microfilm (four episodes of 10 minutes each) tells the story of two vacationers unexpectedly meeting and finding love with each other through a series of adventures during their stay at Resorts World Sentosa. In 2014, Hsu earned wider recognition after appearing in the TVBS series The Way We Were. Her performance won her a Golden Bell Award for Best Supporting Actress.

In 2015, Hsu starred in the horror film The Tag-Along, playing a smart and independent radio DJ who has a fear of commitment in relationships. The movie was well received by critics and did well at the box-office in Taiwan. It opened in second place with NT$8.73 million over three days, which is the best opening for a Taiwanese film since Our Times.

Personal life
From 2006 to 2015, Hsu dated actor Ethan Juan. 

In October 2017, Hsu and Taiwanese cinematographer Liu You-nian were confirmed to be in a relationship. They divorced at the end of 2020. after two years.

On 10 December 2021, Hsu announced her marriage to Roy Chiu, her co-star in the 2021 romance film Man in Love.

Filmography

Television series

Film

Music video appearances

Theatre

Discography

Singles

Published works

Awards and nominations

References

External links

 
 
 
Hsu Wei-ning on Sina Weibo 

1984 births
Living people
Taiwanese female models
Taiwanese television actresses
Taiwanese film actresses
Taiwanese people of American descent
Taiwanese people of Italian descent
21st-century Taiwanese actresses